Goatweed may refer to:

Plants
Ageratum conyzoides, a species of plant in the family Asteraceae
Capraria biflora, a species of plant in the family Scrophulariaceae
Croton (plant), a genus of plants in the family Euphorbiaceae
Hypericum perforatum, a species of plant in the family Hypericaceae
Hypericum erectum, a species of plant in the family Hypericaceae

Other
Anaea andria, a species of butterfly

See also
Horny goat weed